The Curse of the Yellow Snake (German: Der Fluch der gelben Schlange) is a 1963 West German crime thriller film directed by Franz Josef Gottlieb and starring Joachim Fuchsberger, Brigitte Grothum and Pinkas Braun. It is based on the 1926 novel The Yellow Snake by Edgar Wallace. It was made as part of a series of films based on Wallace's work, made either by CCC Film or the rival Rialto.

It was shot at the Spandau Studios in Berlin and on location in London. The film's sets were designed by the art directors Hans Jürgen Kiebach and Ernst Schomer.

Cast
 Joachim Fuchsberger as Clifford Lynn
 Brigitte Grothum as Joan Bray
 Pinkas Braun as Fing-Su / St. Clay
 Doris Kirchner as Mabel Narth
 Werner Peters as Stephan Narth
 Charles Regnier as Major Spedwell
 Claus Holm as Inspektor Frazer
 Fritz Tillmann as Joe Bray
 Eddi Arent as Samuel Carter
 Zeev Berlinsky as Straßenkehrer

References

Bibliography 
 Bergfelder, Tim. International Adventures: German Popular Cinema and European Co-Productions in the 1960s. Berghahn Books, 2005.

External links 
 

1963 films
West German films
German thriller films
1960s thriller films
1960s German-language films
Films directed by Franz Josef Gottlieb
Films shot in London
Films set in London
Films based on British novels
Films shot at Spandau Studios
Constantin Film films
1960s German films